Kasetsart Football Club (Thai: สโมสรฟุตบอลมหาวิทยาลัยเกษตรศาสตร์) is a Thailand football club under the stewardship of Kasetsart University based in Bangkok. They played in Thai League 2.

History
Kasetsart won the Khǒr Royal Cup (ถ้วย ข.) in the 2008 season and gained promotion to the third level. They achieved a 7th-place finish in their first season in the 2009 Thai Division 2 League Bangkok & field Region league. The following season, the club finished 11th in the expanded 13-team 2010 Thai Division 2 League Bangkok & field Region.

In the 2010 Thai League Cup qualifying round, Kasetsart were penalized with a 2–0 loss after they walked off the pitch during the middle of a game with Nonthaburi F.C. The decision to walk off proved costly as a victory over their opponents would have set up a first-round tie with Bangkok Glass.

Big things were expected for the 2011 season with a vastly improved budget and several signings from the Thai Division 1 League. Kasetsart won the Bangkok Division 2 league title but their playoff campaign ended disastrously both on and off the field. The side finished bottom of Group A, collecting five points while their home stadium was unusable due to the 2011 Thai floods. Because of the damage caused to their stadium by the flooding, Kasetasrt had to relocate to their Kampaeng Saen campus in Nakhon Pathom for the 2012 season. Yet again the season ended in disappointment as the Emerald Nagas were pipped for a playoff spot on the last day of the season.

Stadium and locations

Season by season record

P = Played
W = Games won
D = Games drawn
L = Games lost
F = Goals for
A = Goals against
Pts = Points
Pos = Final position

QR1 = First Qualifying Round
QR2 = Second Qualifying Round
R1 = Round 1
R2 = Round 2
R3 = Round 3
R4 = Round 4

R5 = Round 5
R6 = Round 6
QF = Quarter-finals
SF = Semi-finals
RU = Runners-up
W = Winners

Honours

Domestic leagues
Regional League Bangkok Area Division
 Winners (1) : 2011
 Runner-up (2): 2013, 2016
 Khǒr Royal Cup (Tier 4) (ถ้วย ข.):
 Third place: (2000)
 Winners: (2008)

Players

Current squad

Out on loan

Coaching staff

External links
 Kasetsart FC Official Website
 Kasetsart FC Official Facebook

 
Association football clubs established in 1988
Football clubs in Thailand
Sport in Bangkok
1988 establishments in Thailand